Páramo is a district of the Pérez Zeledón canton, in the San José province of Costa Rica.

History 
Páramo was created on 18 January 1984 by Acuerdo Ejecutivo 129.

Geography 
Páramo has an area of  km² and an elevation of  metres.

Demographics 

For the 2011 census, Páramo had a population of  inhabitants.

Transportation

Road transportation 
The district is covered by the following road routes:
 National Route 2
 National Route 325
 National Route 335

References 

Districts of San José Province
Populated places in San José Province